The  is a traditional Mardi Gras event held in many Cajun and Creole communities of French Louisiana on the Tuesday before Ash Wednesday.  is Louisiana French for "Fat Tuesday Run". This rural Mardi Gras celebration is based on early begging rituals, similar to those still celebrated by mummers, wassailers, and celebrants of Halloween. As Mardi Gras is the celebration of the final day before Lent, celebrants drink and eat heavily, dressing in specialized costumes, ostensibly to protect their identities. In Acadiana, popular practices include wearing masks and costumes, overturning social conventions, dancing, drinking alcohol, begging, trail riding, feasting, and whipping. Mardi Gras is one of the few occasions when people are allowed to publicly wear masks in Louisiana. Dance for a Chicken: The Cajun Mardi Gras, a documentary by filmmaker Pat Mire, provides great insight into the history and evolution of this cultural tradition. In popular culture, two HBO series (the crime drama True Detective and the post Hurricane Katrina themed Treme) also make reference to the tradition.

Origins

During the fête, which was a time when begging from house to house was a socially acceptable behavior, disguised revelers would go through the countryside visiting households and performing for offerings. This is similar to other contemporary traditional European customs such as mumming and wassailing which usually occur around Christmas, New Year's, and Epiphany. These traditions originated in a time when most of the land and money was held by the upper classes. The poor, at the end of long winters and short on food, would gather in groups and make their way from castle to manor house to beg for food from the wealthy, dancing and singing in return for the generosity of the nobles. A few of the traditional runs have whipping and penance as part of their traditions. These traditions are traced to the medieval flagellants, who would hold processions through the streets whipping themselves and sometimes onlookers to beat the sin out of them. These traditions were carried to North America by European immigrants during the 17th and 18th centuries. In the mid to late 18th century when the Acadian settlers of the Canadian Maritimes were forcibly deported by the English, many made their way to South Louisiana, settling what would become known as the Acadiana region.

Modern revival
Although the tradition never died out, during the 1930s and 1940s it had begun to fade away, especially during the World War II era as many of the young men who participated were away serving in the armed forces. During the late 1940s and early 1950s the tradition began to be revived and in the 1960s got a major boost with the "Cajun renaissance", a grassroots effort to promote the unique local food, culture, music and language of the area. In 1993, documentary filmmaker Pat Mire chronicled the tradition with his film Dance for a Chicken: The Cajun Mardi Gras. The imagery of the event is represented in work by local artists such as Chuck Broussard, Francis Pavy, and Herb Roe and in the name and packaging of a locally brewed seasonal beer.

The increased popularity of Cajun music and culture has also led to more nonlocal attention for the event. In 2014 the HBO crime drama True Detective included images of  participants and created a cult group whose roots lay partially in the rural Mardi Gras traditions.

In episode 7 of the 11th season of Parts Unknown, Anthony Bourdain participates in Cajun Mardi Gras.

Traditions

People escape from ordinary life through the alcohol and the roles they portray in costume. In the early morning the riders or runners or Mardi Gras (as the troop and its individual members are known) gather in a central meeting place. As they gather,  (the leader of the Mardi Gras) and his co- explain the rules and traditions that must be followed. The  usually rides on horseback, wears a cape and carries a small flag. After he organizes the troop, the bands begin to play and he leads them on the route. Traditions vary in each town with the way it is carried out. Some towns have people on horse back, some on trailers and some on foot, and others use a variation of all three methods. The  is the first to approach the houses along the route, to ask permission to enter onto their property. At this point, in the spirit of frivolity, individual Mardi Gras will attempt to sneak onto the property.

The whips are designed to be flexible and not to inflict any serious damage onto their victims, but do produce a loud noise for the edification of onlookers. Participants claim one has not fully participated until one has been whipped. Once they are on the property, the revelers play a variety of pranks on the farmers and beg for food for the communal gumbo that lies at the end of the route. A prize ingredient is a live chicken, which is usually thrown into the air for the drunken Mardi Gras to chase through the muddy yards and fields.

The Mardi Gras song, known in the local Cajun French as "" and "", is a traditional tune sung by the participants, although the exact lyrics vary greatly from town to town. The melody of the traditional folk song is similar to melodies of the Bretons from the northern coast of France. The tune is played in a minor mode not generally found in other Cajun music. This version is sung at the Church Point :

And the same song in English:

A version of the song by the Balfa Brothers was included in the 1992 film Passion Fish. Many other musicians have recorded versions of the song, with notable artists being Zachary Richard, Steve Riley and the Mamou Playboys, BeauSoleil, Cedric Watson, and Hozier.

Costumes
Many of the traditional costumes are derivatives of the costumes worn in early rural France during the same celebration. The costumes not only conceal the identities of the participants, but also allow them to parody authority figures and society. Role reversals can be employed such men dressing up like women or the rich to pose as the poor. The costumes also directly mock the nobility, the clergy and the educated; celebrants wear miter hats, mortarboards and capuchons, which were initially designed to mock the tall pointy hats worn by noble women. These hats are still worn, primarily by men. Chaperon (headgear) describes the development of the word. The hats are vibrantly decorated to match (or intentionally mis-match) the colorful Mardi Gras costumes that they accompany. The capuchons worn by Mardi Gras celebrants are completely unrelated to the pointy hats worn by the Ku Klux Klan (KKK), founded after the American Civil War, and, in fact, predate the KKK costumes by several hundred years.

Originally the costumes were made from old work clothes decorated with cloth remnants and pieces of feed sack material, as many of the participants could not afford to buy material strictly for the event. This led to a patchwork style that has become associated with the costuming of the event. The shirts and pants of the costume are made by sewing together various pieces of cloth in a patchwork style. The strips of cloth are cut into fringing, and are sewn onto the sleeves, up and down the legs, and on the capuchon. The end effect is a riot of color and pattern. These costumes are also believed to have originated in medieval times. The masks are made by taking ordinary wire mesh window screen and attaching large protruding noses and painting on features such as eyes and mouths. The masks are almost see through, but usually not enough to discern the wearer's identity. Many costumes and masks include animal features like beaks, feathers, hair, fur or tails.

Notable  celebrations
Each community in the Acadiana area celebrates their take on the traditional . Although there are many variations, most still practice the time honored tradition with  leading masked revelers on horseback to gather ingredients for making the communal gumbo. A few notable examples have gained attention as vital parts of the local Cajun culture.

Basile
A provision allowing women to be a part of the  has been in place since the 1980s, and they are also permitted to serve as capitaines. The Basile  have a tradition of begging for nickels (called ). The participants come up to bystanders with an open palm in the traditional begging gesture, and if that does not work, they will try to dig into the pockets or clothes of the bystanders as a prank in an attempt to find the nickels.

Choupic
The rural Mardi Gras in Choupic involves a ritual chasing and flogging with willow tree branches. Young, unmarried men from sixteen or seventeen years old up into their twenties secretly organize the run each year, and they do not disclose their participation in the run to anyone. Once a man is married, he voluntarily stops his participation in the Mardi Gras run. Traditionally, the Mardis Gras were on foot, but today some adaptations have been made, such as the use of pickup trucks and the use of three-wheelers by some participants. The Mardis Gras meet early Mardi Gras morning at Possum Square and then climb into the back of a few pickup trucks to hide. The pickup trucks carry the Mardis Gras from one residential section to another where they chase the children of the town, and make them recite Catholic prayers before giving them their pre-Lenten flogging with willow tree branches or sometimes with the flexible end of a fishing pole. The Choupic  differs from other  in that it does not involve the chasing of chickens nor ritual begging nor the use of horses as a means of transportation.

Church Point

In Church Point the rural Mardi Gras is basically the same as it was in the old days of the early settlers. In 1961 Elton Richard formally organized the event, which until then had been individual, independent groups of riders. Only men are permitted to participate in the run, and all Mardi Gras must be fully masked and costumed. The  holds his position as leader for year after year, until he decides to relinquish it. He appoints his co- who, like himself, must not be masked. The  in Church Point has its own unique lyrics. The Church Point  is held on the Sunday before Mardi Gras, a consequence of the formal organization in 1961. Elton Richard and Senator Paul Tate of Mamou flipped a coin to see who would have their official  on Mardi Gras Day. Mamou won and as a result the Church Point Mardi Gras is on Sunday.

Duralde
In Duralde, an unincorporated village between the towns of Mamou and Basile on the southwestern prairies of Louisiana, is one of the Creole Mardi Gras. Participants at times wear "white face", a way that the Mardi Gras runners dress as "the other" and overturn social conventions and the world for a day.

Elton
Elton, Louisiana is a small town in Jefferson Davis Parish, Louisiana 15 miles west of Eunice on U.S. Route 190. Although it was defunct for a long time, the Elton  was revived in the mid-1990s. The ride starts at sunrise just to the north of town and goes through the Coushatta Indian Reservation and then heads south back toward Elton. Like many of the traditional  the ride is an all-male affair.

Eunice
In Eunice the celebration dates from when the town was first established in the late 19th century. It was abandoned for a short time during World War II when many of the local young men were in the army, but was restarted in 1946. The roughly 2000 participants, both male and female, assemble at the National Guard Armory at the corner of South 9th Street and Maple Avenue at 6 am, and start the run 8 am. They stop at farms along the route and beg for gumbo ingredients and call out "" or "Nickels for the Mardi Gras!" If ingredients or money are given, they thank the givers of charity with a dance. By 3:00 p.m. the revelers return to town for a parade along Second Street. In 1997 a new addition was added to the festivities, the baking of the world's largest king cake.

Gheens
Every year during their Cajun Mardi Gras Chase 20,000 people flock to the town of less than 1000 people for the event. Unlike other Cajun Mardi Gras celebrations, the Gheens event features teenaged boys and men dressed as ghouls riding in pickup trucks. After the morning parades the group meets behind the local church, where costumes are donned and the ground rules are laid out by the veteran runners to the newly initiated. Each of the newcomers must line up and be given a swat by each of the veterans with the yard long willow branches so they know how bad the switches can hurt if over used. The runners are given bells to pin on their clothing. They then load up into their trucks and attack the town with their willow switches, searching for children. They chase the children to "beat the sinful stuff out of them so they can be clean for lent". Their young victims have the choice to either fall to their knees in a penitent position and say "Pardon! Pardon!" or make the Mardi Gras chase them, often taunting and daring them to catch and beat them more.

LeJeune Cove
According to the account published in the Crowley Post Signal on 27 January 2002, the run dates from the earliest days of the L'Anse LeJeune settlement until it disbanded in the 1950s. The LeJeune Cove Mardi Gras was then revived in 2002 after a lapse of approximately 50 years. All male riders on horseback and wagons wear traditional costumes with capuchons and handmade masks. The riders travel from farm to farm, visiting and dancing with their neighbors, begging for money and gumbo ingredients while singing their unique Mardi Gras song, all just as they had done prior to disbandment. The run is now held annually on the Saturday before Fat Tuesday. In the evening, a communal gumbo and dance is held at La Pay E Bas RV Park between Iota and Eunice.

Mamou

In Evangeline Parish, the Mamou celebration starts with a street dance held the Monday evening before Mardi Gras, with bands such as Steve Riley and the Mamou Playboys performing. The Mamou  abides by the older traditions, with the  unmasked and all other revelers masked in the all-male troupe. They are accompanied by a wagon for the musicians and trailers for participants who do not have horses.

The event was suspended twice in its history, during the American Civil War and during World War Two. By the mid-1940s the  tradition in Mamou had declined but was revived by Alfred "Fred" Tate, Revon Reed, and Paul Tate, proprietors of the then newly opened "Fred's Lounge".

Soileau
The run in Soileau, Louisiana is one of the few Creole  in southwest Louisiana, and is thought to be just as old as the Cajun versions. The rural community of Soileau is located to the west of Duralde in Allen Parish, Louisiana not far from the Evangeline Parish, Louisiana line. They hold their run on the Monday before Mardi Gras, with its starting point at Andrew Cezar's sulky racing track. From there they head down Louisiana Highway 104.

South Cameron

Traditional Mardi Gras  have been held in Creole and Grand Chenier, small towns in southern Cameron Parish, since the beginning of the 20th century. This region of Southwest Louisiana has been plagued by multiple hurricanes throughout the years, including total destruction by Hurricanes Audrey, Rita, and Ike. As a result, Mardi Gras celebrations had been defunct for over a decade. The  was revived in 2014 by a group of Cameron Parish natives. The group mainly consisted of young men who were Iraq and Afghanistan war veterans. Some were displaced by the hurricanes, living in different parts of the state, and looking to bring camaraderie and tradition back to their community. The Mardi Gras ride throughout the countryside in cattle trailers pulled by pickup trucks. Men and women ride together. The Mardi Gras stop at multiple houses and business in and around the towns of Creole and Grand Chenier to dance, drink, play tricks, chase chickens, and gather ingredients for their communal gumbo that night. They wear traditional Cajun Mardi Gras costumes as well as modern variations. The two to three unmasked  regulate with burlap whips. A Fais do-do with live music follows the gumbo. This  is held two weekends before Mardi Gras day, however, dates are subject to change from year to year.

Tee Mamou-Iota
An all-women's group was established a few years later. The women's group does their run on Saturday before Mardi Gras and the men's run is on Mardi Gras day. The route of the  ends in the nearby community of Iota, Louisiana. Iota has an organized event, with Cajun and Zydeco bands playing on the main stage throughout Mardi Gras day. The highlight of the day is the arrival of the Tee Mamou  riding into the town in a wagon after the route through the country. Once this task is completed, the Mardi Gras descend on the downtown area dancing and begging for loose change.

References

External links

 Balfa Brothers – La Dance Des Mardi Gras
 Courir de Mardi Gras in Mamou, La 2010
 Rural Mardi Gras – Tee-Mamou
 Rural Mardi Gras : Iota, Louisiana
 NPR's Snap Judgement:Courir de Mardi Gras 
 Lejeune Cove

 

Cajun culture
Acadiana
Mardi Gras
February events
March events
Music festivals in Louisiana
American folklore